Deh Kohneh is an alternate name of Shabankareh, a city in Bushehr Province, Iran.

Deh Kohneh or Deh-e Kohneh or Dehkohneh (meaning "old village") may also refer to:
Deh Kohneh, Tangestan, Bushehr Province
Deh-e Kohneh, Kiar, Chaharmahal and Bakhtiari Province
Deh Kohneh, Lordegan, Chaharmahal and Bakhtiari Province
Deh Kohneh-ye Emamzadeh, Chaharmahal and Bakhtiari Province
Deh Kohneh-ye Halu Saad, Chaharmahal and Bakhtiari Province
Deh Kohneh-ye Rugar, Chaharmahal and Bakhtiari Province
Deh Kohneh, Kazerun, Fars Province
Deh Kohneh, Khorrambid, Fars Province
Deh Kohneh, Lamerd, Fars Province
Deh Kohneh-ye Mollai, Lamerd County, Fars Province
Deh Kohneh, Marvdasht, Fars Province
Deh Kohneh, Sepidan, Fars Province
Deh Kohneh, Dalahu, Kermanshah Province
Deh Kohneh, Kangavar, Kermanshah Province
Deh-e Kohneh, Khuzestan
Deh Kohneh-ye Muzarm, Khuzestan Province
Deh Kohneh-e Dowbalutan, Khuzestan Province
Dehkohneh-ye Hamidabad, Kohgiluyeh and Boyer-Ahmad Province
Deh Kohneh-e Mazdak, Kohgiluyeh and Boyer-Ahmad Province
Deh Kohneh-ye Zafari, Kohgiluyeh and Boyer-Ahmad Province